The small-spotted midwest rock gehyra (Gehyra finipunctata) is a species of gecko in the genus Gehyra. It is endemic to Western Australia.

References

Gehyra
Reptiles described in 2018
Geckos of Australia